The 2008–09 BBL season was the 22nd campaign in the history of the British Basketball League (BBL), which commenced on 14 September 2008 with the Cup Winners' Cup. The regular season began a week later with 12 teams competing, though a line-up change saw the Birmingham Panthers withdraw and fold during close season and the inclusion of Worthing Thunder from the English Basketball League.

Newcastle Eagles continued their dominance of Britain's basketball scene, scooping up the League title, the Play-off crown and the BBL Trophy, beating rivals Guildford Heat 71-83 at the Guildford Spectrum. After a promising rookie season for Everton Tigers in 2007–08, the Merseyside team came of age in their sophomore year, finishing as runners-up in the League and the play-offs whilst entering the record books for their 103-49 win in the BBL Cup Final against Plymouth Raiders, the biggest winning margin (54 points) in BBL history and lowest ever score conceded in a Final.

This season also saw the return of the BBL All-Star game, which was played as a warm-up to the play-off Grand Final. Two select-teams – the British All-Stars and the Rest of the World All-Stars – were pitted together using a selection of players from across the League, with the Rest of the World team narrowly winning 117-124.

Teams

Notable occurrences 
 Following a disastrous rookie campaign and lack of investment the Birmingham Panthers franchise folded during the close season and would not return for the 2008–09 season.
 The gap vacated by Panthers was subsequently occupied by Worthing Thunder who stepped up from the English Basketball League Division 1. Though their application was accepted before the Panthers folded, Worthing were one of two South-coast franchises bidding for a place in the BBL, with an unsuccessful bid coming from Brighton Cougars.
 The second edition of the Cup Winners' Cup saw Guildford Heat sweep away the honours yet again with a closely fought two-game series against last season's BBL Cup winners Milton Keynes Lions. Heat ran out victors with a 159-149 aggregate score.

BBL Championship (Tier 1)

Final standings

The play-offs

Quarter-finals

Semi-finals

Final

Cup Winners' Cup 
The Cup Winners' Cup was contested between the winners of the BBL Cup and BBL Trophy from the previous season. Guildford were winners of the Trophy and Milton Keynes were winners of the Cup. The tournament was played over two-legs – one at each home arena – and the winner decided by a total aggregate score from both games.

First leg

Second leg 

Guildford Heat win 159-149 on aggregate scoring.

EBL National League Division 1 (Tier 2)

Final standings

EBL National League Division 2 (Tier 3)

Final standings

BBL Cup 
Of the 12 competing teams in this season's BBL Cup, eight entered into the First Round while the top-four ranked teams from last season's Championship – Guildford Heat, Milton Keynes Lions, Newcastle Eagles and Plymouth Raiders – received byes into the quarter-finals, where they would also receive home-court advantage.

First round

Quarter-finals

Semi-finals 1st Leg

Semi-finals 2nd Leg 

Plymouth Raiders win 162-142 on aggregate and Everton Tigers win 202-198 on aggregate.

Final

BBL Trophy 
The First Round of the BBL Trophy uses its usually round-robin format with the 12 competing teams divided into four regionalised groups with the winner of each group then advancing to a two-legged Semi-final encounter and progress to the Final being determined by a total aggregate score.

Group stage 

Group 1

Group 3

Group 2

Group 4

Semi-finals 1st Leg

Semi-finals 2nd Leg 

Guildford Heat win 187-161 on aggregate and Newcastle Eagles win 176-159 on aggregate.

Final

All-Star Game

Seasonal awards 

 Most Valuable Player: Trey Moore (Newcastle)
 Coach of the Year: Rob Paternostro (Leicester)
 All-Star First Team:
 Trey Moore (Newcastle)
 Andre Smith (Everton)
 Keonta Howell (Guildford)
 Robert Yanders (Scots Rocks)
 Tommy Swanson (Leicester)
 All-Star Second Team:
 Mike Martin (Guildford)
 Josh Gross (Everton)
 Andrew Lasker (Plymouth)
 Anthony Paez (Worcester)
 Chris Sanders (Sheffield)

References 

British Basketball League seasons
1
British